Myles Erlick (born July 27, 1998) is a Canadian actor, dancer, and singer. He is known for portraying the role of Noah on the Family series The Next Step. Prior to appearing on The Next Step, he starred as the titular character in Billy Elliot the Musical.

Early life
Erlick was born on July 27, 1998, in Burlington, Ontario. He was raised by mother Francesca Nicassio, a talent manager who owns the Canadian talent school Stars Academy, which Erlick attended. His step-father is Ryan Marshall, a former member of the Canadian band Walk off the Earth. Erlick trained at Canada's National Ballet School, while also attending the Dr. Frank J. Hayden Secondary School. From 2015-2022, Erlick was in a relationship with fellow dancer and co-star Briar Nolet. He began dating Emily Fisher in 2022.

Career
Erlick made his television debut in an episode of the CTV crime drama series Flashpoint in 2011. Later that year, it was announced that he had been cast in the Canadian Broadway tour of Billy Elliot the Musical, in the titular role. Prior to this, he portrayed the role in the Toronto production. In 2013, he joined the cast of the Family series The Next Step in the recurring role of Noah. In the third season, Erlick's character was promoted to the regular cast, and he remained in the regular cast of the series until its sixth season in 2018. He also appeared in various international tours as part of the promotion for The Next Step. Following his exit from The Next Step, Erlick began focusing on a music career, releasing singles including "Serious", "All Day All Night" featuring Tate McRae, and "Filthy". The singles were included on the tracklist of his debut studio album, Me, released on May 22, 2018. In 2019, it was announced that he had been cast by Steven Spielberg in the 2021 film West Side Story as Snowboy, one of the Jets. Later that year, he was nominated in the 2019 CelebMix Awards for Best Dancer.

Filmography

Awards and nominations

References

External links
 
 

1998 births
Living people
21st-century Canadian male actors
21st-century Canadian male singers
Canadian male child actors
Canadian male dancers
Canadian male television actors
Canadian people of Italian descent
Male actors from Ontario
Musicians from Ontario
People from Burlington, Ontario